Harald Turner (8 October 1891 – 9 March 1947) was an SS commander and Staatsrat (privy councillor) in the German military administration of the Territory of the Military Commander in Serbia in the partitioned Kingdom of Yugoslavia during World War II. In a 1942 letter to Karl Wolff, chief of the personal staff of Reichsführer-SS Heinrich Himmler, Turner indicated the murderous nature of Schutzstaffel (SS) activities in the occupied territory. In the letter he indirectly indicated that he intended to use vehicles most likely equipped with gas to murder Jews.

His quotation marks around the vehicle's name indicate that the vehicle was meant for killing the Jews he mentioned. This follows a similar practice by the Nazis to publicly call gas chambers in concentration camps, "shower rooms".

In 1946, Turner was extradited to Yugoslavia where he was tried and convicted. He was executed in 1947.

See also
List SS-Gruppenführer

References

1891 births
1947 deaths
Holocaust perpetrators in Yugoslavia
Nazi Party officials
SS-Gruppenführer
Executed people from Hesse
Serbia under German occupation
Nazis executed by Yugoslavia by hanging
People from Lahn-Dill-Kreis
Jewish Serbian history
20th-century Freikorps personnel
German people convicted of war crimes
Executed mass murderers